This is a timeline documenting events of jazz in the year 2023.

Events

January

February

March

April

May

June

July

August

September

October

November

December

Albums

January

February

Deaths
February 2 – Butch Miles, 78, American drummer
February 13 – Guido Basso, 85, Canadian trumpeter.
 Alain Goraguer, 91, French pianist, arranger and film composer
February 17 – Jerry Dodgion, 90, American saxophonist and flautist
February 25 – Carl Saunders, 80, American trumpeter, composer and educator
March 1 – Wally Fawkes, 98, Canadian-British clarinettist and satirical cartoonist
March 2 – Wayne Shorter, 89, tenor saxophonist

See also

 List of 2023 albums
 List of jazz festivals
 List of years in jazz
 2023 in music

References

External links 

2020s in jazz
Jazz
Jazz